
Gmina Jemielno is a rural gmina (administrative district) in Góra County, Lower Silesian Voivodeship, in southwestern Poland.

Neighbouring gminas
Gmina Jemielno is bordered by the gminas of Góra, Niechlów, Rudna, Wąsosz and Wińsko.

Villages
The gmina contains the villages of Bieliszów, Borki, Chobienia, Chorągwice, Ciechanów, Cieszyny, Czeladź Mała, Daszów, Irządze, Jemielno, Kietlów, Łęczyca, Luboszyce, Luboszyce Małe, Lubów, Majówka, Osłowice, Piotrowice Małe, Piskorze, Psary, Równa, Śleszów, Smolne, Stanowice, Uszczonów, Zawiszów and Zdziesławice.

References

Jemielno
Góra County